Aurelius and Natalie (died 852) were Christian martyrs who were put to death during the reign of Abd ar-Rahman II, Emir of Córdoba, and are counted among the Martyrs of Córdoba.

Aurelius was the son of a Muslim father and a Christian mother. He was also secretly a follower of Christianity, as was his wife Natalie, who was also the child of a Muslim father. One of Aurelius's cousins, Felix, accepted Islam for a short time, but later converted back to Christianity and married a Christian woman, Liliosa.

Under Sharia Law, all four of them were required to profess Islam. In time all four began to openly profess their Christianity, with the two women going about in public with their faces unveiled. They were all swiftly arrested as apostates from Islam.

They were given four days to recant, but they refused and were beheaded. They were martyred with a local monk, George, who had openly spoken out against the Islamic prophet Mohammed. He had been offered a pardon as a foreigner but chose instead to denounce Islam again and die with the others.

They are considered saints in the Roman Catholic Church, and in the Orthodox Church with a feast day of 27 July.

References 
 Attwater, Donald and Catherine Rachel John. The Penguin Dictionary of Saints. 3rd edition. New York: Penguin Books, 1993. .

External links
 http://www.catholic.org/saints/saint.php?saint_id=309
 http://www.familiario.com/santoral/NataliadeC%F3rdoba.htm
 http://www.santopedia.com/santos/santa-liliosa-de-cordoba

9th-century Christian saints
Year of birth missing
852 deaths
Saints duos
Medieval Spanish saints
People executed by Spain by decapitation
People executed for apostasy from Islam
People from Córdoba, Spain
Converts to Christianity from Islam
Spanish former Muslims
Spanish Roman Catholic saints
Executed Spanish people
Groups of Roman Catholic saints
9th-century Christian martyrs
Christian saints killed by Muslims
Female saints of medieval Spain
9th-century people from al-Andalus
9th-century Spanish women
Christians from al-Andalus